William Marks is a Commander in the U.S. Navy. He is currently the public affairs officer and chief spokesperson for the Defense Intelligence Agency.

In his roles as Public Affairs Officer for the Defence Intelligence Agency and Chief of Media for the U.S. Navy, Marks has frequently appeared in the press and other media explaining U.S. policies as they changed as a result of the "War on Terror". He has been the spokesman for military policy in a number of important areas including the largest search in history, the Search for Malaysia Airlines Flight 370. At the height of the media interest in the plane search, Marks and his 7 sub-ordinates gave 26 interviews and answered 200 email requests for information during a 24 hour period. Eventually his team gave 182 live interviews over a 30-day period before the search was concluded. While serving at the Pentagon he was lead spokesperson for environmental, medical and legal issues.

Education
Marks graduated from Amsterdam High School in Amsterdam, New York, where he was a National Merit semi-finalist. In 1996 he graduated from the U.S. Naval Academy in Annapolis, Maryland. He later attended graduate school at San Diego State University where he earned a Master's in Mass Communication and Media Studies in 2007.

Career
Marks' current assignment is as the public affairs officer and chief spokesperson for the Defense Intelligence Agency.

Previously, Marks led the U.S. Navy's communication team as Chief of Media Operations at the Navy’s Office of Information.

Commander Marks spoke at the Digital Summit in Washington, D.C., sharing the platform with well known speakers including Seth Godin.

Shore duty
Marks’s shore assignments include tours as Executive Officer on board Old Ironsides in Boston. His public affairs assignments included director of the community relations programs for the Navy.  While serving in the office of the Chief of Navy Personnel he was team leader for internal communication to more than 300,000 Navy.

As Public Affairs Officer for United States Seventh Fleet, Marks was in charge of communications for the Navy’s largest fleet, and dealt with 35 maritime nations spread out over 124 million square kilometers of the Pacific Ocean.

Sea duty
At sea, Marks served aboard USS Gettysburg and USS Spruance as a surface warfare officer, and aboard the USS Abraham Lincoln as Public Affairs Officer.  During his tour of duty on the Spruance, he was named a U.S. Atlantic Fleet “Shiphandler of the Year.”

Decorations
Marks has earned the following medals: the Meritorious Service Medal (4 times), the Navy Commendation Medal (3 times), Battle E awards from USS Gettysburg and USS Abraham Lincoln, and other individual, unit and campaign awards.

Other honors
July 16, 2004 was declared "William J. Marks Day" in Massachusetts by Governor Mitt Romney.
Named a Boston Celtics "Heroes Among Us" in March 2004.
Rang the opening bell at the New York Stock Exchange.

Media appearances
Marks appeared on Face the Nation on March 30, 2014.

References

External links
https://www.cnn.com/videos/topvideos/2014/03/17/tsr-bts-william-marks-andaman-island-search.cnn
http://www.themalaymailonline.com/malaysia/article/us-fleet-commander-says-radar-hits-not-from-missing-plane#0ywEq7XdzUVQLSs4.97

1974 births
Living people
United States Navy officers
United States Naval Academy alumni
San Diego State University alumni